The arrival of Sikhism in Wales is relatively recent and at Census 2021 there were 4,048 Sikhs in the country representing 0.1% of the population.

Sikhs have faced some difficulties in Wales: in 2000, a popular Sikh was murdered in a racially motivated attack in Port Talbot. The issue of Sikhism in Wales again came to wider attention in 2008 when the only Sikh pupil at Aberdare Girls' School was banned from school for refusing to remove her Kara though the High Court eventually ruled that the school had been wrong to exclude her.

The first purpose-built Sikh gurdwara was opened in Cardiff in 1989.

See also
Sikhism in England
Sikhism in Scotland
Religion in Wales

References

External links
Sikh Gurdwara Cardiff

Sikhism
Sikhism in the United Kingdom